Øygard may refer to:

 IL Øygard, forerunner of Sotra SK, a sports club in Hordaland, Norway
 Olav Øygard (born 1956), Lutheran bishop in Norway
 Rune Øygard (born 1959), Norwegian politician convicted of child sexual abuse
 Svein Harald Øygard (born 1960), Norwegian economist